Manuel Bobadilla González (born 27 June 1970) is a Cuban retired footballer.

Club career
Regarded as the best Cuban player at the end of the 1990s, Bobadilla played his entire career for local side Ciudad La Habana, except for half a season in Germany with Bonner SC, when then Cuban leader Fidel Castro approved for the whole Cuban team to join the German 4th level side for part of the 1998/99 season. After retiring from football in 2001 due to coach Miguel Company ruling him out for the national team, he returned to play for Ciudad la Habana in the 2005 season.

International career
He made his international debut for Cuba in 1995 and has earned a total of 57 caps, scoring 11 goals. He represented his country in 13 FIFA World Cup qualification matches (1 goal) and played at the 1998 CONCACAF Gold Cup.

His final international was an August 2001 Gold Cup qualification play-off match against Panama.

International goals
Scores and results list Cuba's goal tally first.

References

External links
 

1970 births
Living people
Sportspeople from Havana
Association football midfielders
Cuban footballers
Cuba international footballers
1998 CONCACAF Gold Cup players
FC Ciudad de La Habana players
Bonner SC players
Cuban expatriate footballers
Expatriate footballers in Germany
Cuban expatriate sportspeople in Germany